The honeycomb cowfish (Acanthostracion polygonius) belongs to family Ostraciidae. It is also known simply as the trunkfish or cowfish.

Description 
The honeycomb cowfish has armor-like, hexagonal scales covering most of its body. It is named for its unique honeycomb-like pattern and "horns". This pattern helps the fish to blend in with coral reefs. Most honeycomb cowfish tend to be blue in color, but can also be yellow, gray, or green. Juveniles are generally more colorful than adults. They have no pelvic fins, and the caudal fin is rounded.

Honeycomb cowfish have several modified bony scales and "horns." These serve as a means of protection. Honeycomb cowfish can be distinguished from similar fish by the two spines above their eyes and hexagonal pattern. Compared to other boxfish, the honeycomb cowfish has a smaller, protruding mouth and fleshy lips.

The maximum body length is 50 centimeters, but the average length is 25 centimeters.

Distribution 
This species is distributed throughout the western Atlantic, the Caribbean Sea, and waters near Brazil. They are absent throughout most of the Gulf of Mexico, but there are populations around Florida.

Habitat 
The honeycomb cowfish lives in warm, clear waters near coral reefs, sea grass beds, and in estuaries. It is an uncommon and cautious species.

Behavior 
Honeycomb cowfish are usually solitary, but can be seen in groups of threes consisting of one male and two females. Little is known about their reproduction, but they are known to mate in open water. They have been observed quickly swimming to the surface in pairs, releasing their gametes, and quickly swimming back down.

Honeycomb cowfish have the ability to change color in order to protect themselves from predation. Once camouflaged, the fish can remain stationary for long periods of time.

The juveniles have better swimming abilities than adults due to their rounder bodies.

Diet 
Feeding occurs during the day. Their diet consists of small marine invertebrates including shrimp, sponges, algae, tunicates, and worms.

Human Use 
The honeycomb cowfish is considered to be a valuable food fish. It is marketed fresh, and is prized in the Caribbean where it is abundant. There have been several reports of ciguatera poisoning from the consumption of this fish. It is also sold commercially as an aquarium fish.

References

External links
 

honeycomb cowfish
Fish of the Eastern United States
Fish of the Western Atlantic
honeycomb cowfish